Danielle Steer (born April 29, 1999) is a Canadian soccer player who plays for A-League Women club Western United.

Early life
Steer played youth soccer with Coastal FC. She also played for the British Columbia provincial team.

University career
In 2017, Steer began attending the University of British Columbia, where she played for the women's soccer team. On September 9, 2017, she scored her first goals, scoring twice against the UFV Cascades in a 3–0 victory. In 2019, she won the U Sports women's soccer championship and was named the championship MVP. On October 8, 2021, she scored her first hat trick in a 3–0 victory over the UBC Okanagan Heat. In 2021, she set the Canada West Conference single season goals record with 18. In 2022, she set the all-time Canada West career points record in women's soccer, passing the former record of 65 points set by Jasmin Dhanda. In 2022, she helped UBC capture their first Canada West title since 2016. In 2022, she was named the Canada West Player of the Year. She scored in her final match for UBC as UBC defeated the Trinity Western Spartans 1–0 in the consolation final of the national tournament. She finished her career with 57 goals and 28 assists in 97 games (including 46 goals and 25 assists for the record 71 total points in Canada West competition). She was named to the 2017 Canada West All-Rookie team, was a three-time Canada West First Team All-Star in 2018, 2021, and 2022, and a 2018 U Sports Second Team All-Canadian and 2022 U Sports First Team All-Canadian.

Club career
In 2022, she played with Varsity FC in League1 British Columbia. On June 7, 2022, she scored two goals in a 3–0 victory over Altitude FC.

In January 2023, she signed her first professional contract with Australian A-League Women club Western United. She made her debut on January 11 against Sydney FC. She scored her first goal on January 28 against Canberra United FC.

Personal
Steer's mother is the niece of Australian swimmer and four-time Olympic gold medalist Dawn Fraser.

References

External links

Living people
1999 births
Canadian women's soccer players
Women's association football forwards
Nautsa’mawt FC players
League1 British Columbia players
Canada West Universities Athletic Association players
UBC Thunderbirds soccer players
A-League Women players